Margaret of Flanders (died 1331) was a consort of Alexander, Prince of Scotland and later wife of Reinauld I, Count of Guelders. 

She was the daughter of Guy, Count of Flanders and his second wife Isabelle of Luxembourg. In 1281, King Alexander II of Scotland started negotiating with the Count of Flanders, about the marriage of the Count's daughter Margaret to the Prince Alexander. The couple were married on 14 November 1282 at Roxburgh, Scotland and the marriage was celebrated the following day. Prince Alexander died a week after his twentieth birthday, on 28 January 1284.

On 3 July 1286, Margaret was married to Reinauld I, Count of Guelders, in Namur, Wallonia. They had six children, Reginald II, Margaret, Guy, Philippe, Elisabeth and Philippa.

References

Bibliography

13th-century births

1331 deaths
Year of birth unknown
Margaret